The Christian Munsee are a group of Lenape (also known as Delaware), an Indigenous people in the United States, that primarily speak Munsee and have converted to Christianity, following the teachings of Moravian missionaries. The Christian Munsee are also known as the Moravian Munsee or the Moravian Indians, the Moravian Christian Indians or, in context, simply the Christian Indians. As the Moravian Church transferred some of their missions to other Christian denominations, such as the Methodists, Christian Munsee today belong to the Moravian Church, Methodist Church, United Church of Canada, among other Christian denominations.

The Christian Munsee tribe has produced several people who have become notable figures in Christianity and the Delaware Nation as a whole, such as Gelelemend (a Lenape chief), John Henry Kilbuck (a Moravian Christian missionary to the Native peoples in Alaska), Papunhank (a Moravian Lenape diplomat and preacher), Glikhikan (Munsee chief, Moravian elder, and Christian martyr), and Washington Jacobs (a chief of the Moravian of the Thames reservation). 

Present-day Christian Munsee communities include Moravian of the Thames, the Christian Munsee tribe in Kansas, and the Stockbridge–Munsee Community.

History
Starting in the 1740s, the Moravian Church sent out Christian missionaries to American Indian tribes and started settlements, with full tribal support. The ranks of the Christian Munsee thus include influential Lenape chiefs from the start. The Moravian Christian approach was to preserve Lenape cultural practices while passing on to the Lenape the Gospel message with the entirety of the Christian faith. As such, Moravian Christian missionaries developed the orthography for Lenape dialects and David Zeisberger "compiled dictionaries of various Native tongues, translating them into English and German".

Mid-Atlantic states and Ohio
The Munsee were the Wolf Clan of the Lenape, occupying the area where present-day New York, Pennsylvania and New Jersey meet. The first recorded European contact occurred in 1524, when Giovanni da Verrazzano sailed into what is now New York Harbor. Like most native peoples of the Atlantic coast, the Munsee were quickly devastated by European diseases such as smallpox and influenza, and those who survived were forced inland. By the mid-18th century, one group of Lenape people began to follow the teachings of the Moravian missionaries. The Moravians were descended from the exiled Protestants from Morava, now Czech Republic, who founded a Protestant denomination from Herrnhut in the Germann state of Saxony. They sought to protect their converts by creating separate mission villages in the frontier, apart from both European settlers and from other native people. 

The most prominent missionary among the Munsee was David Zeisberger. In 1772, he led his group of Christian Munsee to the Ohio Country, which he hoped would isolate them from the hostilities of the approaching American Revolution. However, in 1782, a force of Pennsylvania militiamen, in search of Indians who had been raiding settlements in western Pennsylvania, happened upon a group of ninety-six of Zeisberger's Christian Munsee harvesting corn, and rounded them up in the eastern Ohio village of Gnadenhütten. Although the Munsee truthfully pleaded their innocence and explained their non-combatant, nonresistant Christian convictions, the militia took a vote and decided to kill them all, including the women and children; these faithful are known as the Moravian Christian Indian Martyrs.

While the American militiamen murdered the Moravian Christian Indians in Gnadenhutten, a messenger sent by the Moravian missionaries in Sandusky on March 3 reached Schoenbrunn on March 6 in order to deliver the news that all of them would be moving to Detroit; two of the Moravian Indians from Schoenbrunn went to inform their brethren in Gnadenhutten but on their journey there, they saw that the American soldiers had mangled body of Joseph Schebosh Jr, a Moravian with a European father and Indian mother. They buried his body and quickly returned to warn their brethren in Schoenbrunn as they thought that the others at Gnadenhutten met the same fate. For this reason, the Moravian Christian Indians at Schoenbrunn were able to flee to Sandusky before the American militiamen could advance from Gnadenhutten to Schoenbrunn, where they planned to commit another massacre.

In 1798, David Zeisberger led many of the Moravian Christian Indians back to Ohio, where they established the Goshen Mission near Schoenbrunn; there, Zeisberger lived until he peacefully died after which many of the Moravian Christian Indians moved to Ontario (cf. Delaware Nation at Moraviantown) and others to Kansas, along with Christian missionaries who continued to live and work among them. The descendants of both Jacob and Ester, the children of Israel Welapachtshechen (who was martyred in the Gnadenhutten massacre), make up the majority of the Christian Munsee tribe in Kansas today. In 1903, the Moravian Christians transferred the Christian Munsee mission in Moraviantown to Methodist Christians, a denomination that eventually joined the United Church of Canada, a United Protestant denomination to which many Christian Munsee belong to today.

Ontario
After ten more years of strife, most of the Christian Munsee followed Zeisberger to Ontario, Canada, where they established a new home at Fairfield, commonly known as Moraviantown, along the Thames River. There they lived in relative peace for twenty years, supporting themselves with their farming and industry. However, once again they became unwitting victims of war, when American soldiers burned their village to the ground during the War of 1812 Battle of the Thames. The battle is well known historically as a victory for General William Henry Harrison, and for the death of the Shawnee chief Tecumseh, but the destruction of Moraviantown is little more than a footnote. The Munsee fled into the wilderness for safe haven until hostilities had ceased, then returned to build a new Fairfield across the Thames River to the south, which is now known as Moraviantown. In 1903, the Moravian Christians transferred the Christian Munsee mission in Moraviantown to Methodist Christians, a denomination that eventually joined the United Church of Canada, a United Protestant denomination to which many Christian Munsee belong to today.

Wisconsin
By the 1830s, a faction of the Christian Munsee favored a move to the American West. In 1837, some of the Munsee from Fairfield journeyed to Wisconsin to join another Christian band of Indians, the Stockbridge Indians, a combination of the last remnants of the Mohican and Wappinger peoples of the east bank of the Hudson, whence the two tribes became known collectively as the Stockbridge-Munsee. They are now the Stockbridge-Munsee Community in Shawano County, Wisconsin. However, most of the Munsee eventually returned to Canada. The Christian Munsee in southern Ontario remain today as the Moravian of the Thames and the Munsee-Delaware Nation.

Kansas
A small band of Christian Munsee decided to migrate again, this time to Kansas Territory, to join their non-Christian Lenape kinsmen. They settled first in Wyandotte County, then Leavenworth County. A few families settled near Fort Scott in Bourbon County. By 1857, most of the other Lenape (of Kansas) were removed to Indian Territory.

The Christian Munsee, who now numbered less than one hundred, chose to purchase a new reservation in Franklin County from a small band of Ojibwa (Chippewa) that had migrated from Michigan. The Treaty of 1859 officially combined the Swan Creek and Black River Band Chippewa and the Christian Munsee on a reservation of twelve square miles along the Marais des Cygnes River near the town of Ottawa. Signing the treaty for the Munsee were Henry Donohoe, Ignatius Caleb, and John Williams.

Although the two tribes shared a reservation and were considered one tribe by the United States government in all dealings, they maintained their separate identities in cultural and religious practices. The Moravian church continued to send missionaries to the Munsee.

Under the Dawes Act, the Chippewa-Christian Indian Reservation, as it was known in the 1859 treaty, was allotted to the individual members and descendants of the tribes in separate 160-acre plots.  The people eventually accepted assimilation. In 1900, the final disbursement of federal funds was paid, and all benefits and official recognition as Native Americans were dissolved. A number of the Christian Munsee Tribe in Kansas live on the reservation in Ottawa, Kansas where they cling to their Christian faith and Lenape heritage.

Notable members of the Christian Munsee tribe
The Christian Munsee tribe has produced several people who have become notable figures in both Christianity and the Delaware Nation as a whole:

Gelelemend, Lenape chief of the Turtle clan
John Henry Kilbuck, Moravian Christian missionary to the Native peoples in Alaska
Papunhank, a Moravian Christian Lenape diplomat and preacher
Glikhikan, Munsee chief, Moravian Christian elder, and Moravian Christian martyr
96 Moravian Christian Indian Martyrs, who practiced nonresistance as they were murdered in the Gnadenhutten massacre on 8 March 1782
Washington Jacobs, chief of the Moravian of the Thames reservation.

See also
Praying Indians
Mission Indians
Indian Reductions

References

Census of the Chippewa and Christian Indians, June 30, 1893. Washington, DC: National Archives and Records Administration, National Archives Building.

External links
Christian Munsee Tribe in Kansas
Delaware Nation at Moraviantown
"A Fragment of Kansas Land History: The Disposal of the Christian Indian Tract" from the Kansas Historical Quarterly.
Treaty with the Chippewa, Etc., 1859
Chippewa-Munsee Genealogy

Native American Christianity
Great Lakes tribes
Native American tribes in New Jersey
Franklin County, Kansas
Wyandotte County, Kansas
Shawano County, Wisconsin
First Nations in Ontario
Lenape
History of the America (North) Province of the Moravian Church
Assimilation of indigenous peoples of North America